Gnophaela is a genus of tiger moths in the family Erebidae. The genus was erected by Francis Walker in 1854.

Species
It consists of the following species:
Gnophaela vermiculata (Grote, [1864])
Gnophaela discreta Stretch, 1875
Gnophaela aequinoctialis Walker, 1854
Gnophaela latipennis (Boisduval, 1852)
Gnophaela clappiana Holland, 1891

References

External links

 
Pericopina
Moth genera